Rikkie-Lee Tyrrell is a member of the Victorian Legislative Council for the Pauline Hanson's One Nation representing the Northern Victoria Region. She was elected in the 2022 Victorian state election. Tyrrell is One Nation's first member of the Victorian parliament.

Tyrell previously ran as the One Nation Candidate in Division of Nicholls for the 2019 Australian federal election, finishing 3rd, and at the 2022 Australian federal election, finishing 5th.

Tyrell was a dairy farmer the past 16 years prior to her election to the Legislative Council.

References

Pauline Hanson's One Nation politicians
One Nation members of the Parliament of Victoria
Members of the Victorian Legislative Council
21st-century Australian politicians
Year of birth missing (living people)
Living people